Lockrose is a rural locality split between the Lockyer Valley Region and Somerset Region of Queensland, Australia.

Geography 
Lockrose is in South East Queensland. The northern boundary of Lockrose is marked by Lockyer Creek and the southern boundary by Brightview Road.

Although not officially gazetted as a town, there is an established urban area in the centre of the locality where the school, church and other amenities are located and surrounded by housing. There is a second pocket of rural residential development in the south of the locality.

Areas along the creek have been intensely farmed with irrigated crops with other rural land used for grazing on native vegetation.

History
Lockrose Provisional School opened 20 March 1905. It became Lockrose State School on 1 January 1909.

Green Pastures Lutheran Church opened in November 1909 under the leadership of Pastor Millat. There were approximately 350 people in attendance including the children at the school who were given a holiday so they could attend. It was described as the largest festival to have taken place in Lockrose.

Lockrose Post Office opened by 1913 (a receiving office had been open from 1906) and closed in 1972.

Lockrose had a population of 553 at the 2011 Census.

Education 

Lockrose State School is a government primary (Prep-6) school for boys and girls at 17 Zabel Road. In 2017, the school had an enrolment of 64 students with 5 teachers and 9 non-teaching staff (5 full-time equivalent).

There is no secondary school in Lockrose. The nearest secondary school is in Lowood, with others in Rosewood, Laidley and Gatton.

Amenities 
Services are held at the Green Pastures Lutheran Church in Zabel Road each Sunday. There is a cemetery behind the church.

References

Lockyer Valley Region
Suburbs of Somerset Region
Localities in Queensland